Payakumbuh is the second largest city in West Sumatra province, Indonesia, with a population of 116,825 at the 2010 Census and 139,576 at the 2020 Census. It covers an area of 80.43 km² and is in the Minangkabau Highlands, 120 km by road from the West Sumatran capital city of Padang and 180 km from the Riau capital city of Pekanbaru. 

The whole area is surrounded on all sides by (but administratively independent from) the Lima Puluh Kota Regency, making it an enclave. It is located near the volcanoes of Mount Merapi, Mount Sago, and Bukit Barisan. Payakumbuh means "grassy swamp" in the Minangkabau language., suggesting that the area was originally swampy. 

In 2011, Payakumbuh had the highest economic growth of any city in West Sumatra. Innovations in sanitation, waste management, healthy traditional markets, street vendors coaching, and urban drainage resulted in this city being awarded the "Urban Innovation Management" in 2012. In 2013, Payakumbuh received the "Adipura" ('cleanest city') award in the category of small city for the seventh time.

Payakumbuh is known for flying duck races, foods like batiah (small sweet rice cookies), gelamai (a sweet coconut palm sugared snack) and rendang. Payakumbuh produces a wide range of agriculture products including rice, milk, cattle and palm sugar.

Payakumbuh and its surrounding villages, namely Mungka, Simalanggang and Batuhampar are the origin of the Negeri Sembilan people of Malaysia.

Transportation

Payakumbuh is connected to Padang and Pekanbaru by road; a dysfunctional railway line also exists. For inner-city transport, Payakumbuh employs a public transportation system known as "Sago", taken from name of a nearby volcano (Mount Sago) in Payakumbuh. In addition, transport within the city occurs in the form of horse-drawn carts known as bendi.

Administrative districts
The city is administratively divided into five administrative districts (kecamatan), 8 kanagarian, and 76 villages (kelurahan). A mayor (walikota) leads the city administration.
The districts are listed below with their areas and their populations at the 2010 Census and 2020 Census.

Tourism
Payakumbuh is considered as one of the most popular cities in West Sumatra for domestic and foreign tourists. The varieties of food, the Muslim clothes stores, and natural scenery are some of the attractions of city. Attractions within and surrounding the city include:

 Harau Valley: A karstic valley with immense, steep cliffs and spectacular waterfalls. Rock climbing is quite popular in this area due to the ideal conditions of the precipices.
 Ngalau Indah Caverns and Caves: Caves with fantastic stalactites and stalagmites and including views of Payakumbuh and its surroundings.
 Kepala Bonda: Site which can be visited for bamboo river-rafting.
 Rumah Godang Sungai Baringin, a large and splendid rumah gadang (a traditional home of the Minangkabau people), located between rice fields
 Koto Nan Ampek Old Mosque: Among the oldest mosques in West Sumatra, characterized by traditional Minangkabau architecture.
 Museum Rumah Kelahiran Tan Malaka (Museum of Tan Malaka Birthplace): the house in which Indonesian founding father Tan Malaka was born.

References

External links
 Official website

Cities in West Sumatra
Populated places in West Sumatra